(born November 4, 1976 in Matsuyama, Ehime Prefecture, Japan) is a former Japanese professional motorcycle racer currently working as a rider instructor in Suzuka Racing School. He is one of the few riders to win races in both MotoGP and Superbike World Championship.

Career

Early career
After a junior career in minibikes, he won a regional 250cc championship in 1994. He then spent 4 years in the main Japanese 250cc series, finishing 4th on a private bike in 1998. He entered the MFJ Superbike championship in 1999. He finished in the championship top 5 for the next 4 years, but came to international fame as a wild card in the Superbike World Championship round at Sugo, upsetting the regulars to win both races in 2001, and a further race in 2002, being the only rider other than Colin Edwards or Troy Bayliss to have won a race during the 2002 season.

MotoGP World Championship
This helped earn him a call up to MotoGP in 2003, for Pramac Honda. The first season was a learning year, peaking with a 3rd place at Rio and two front row starts, finishing 11th overall. He joined Sito Pons' Camel Honda a year later. 2004 was his strongest MotoGP season to date, with wins at Rio and Motegi and 6th overall. He was the only Honda rider to use Bridgestone tyres, which appear to suit his style.

The Konica Minolta Honda team was formed in late 2004 with him in mind, and he spent 2 years there using Michelin rubber. Unfortunately a broken wrist sustained early in the season prevented him from reaching the championship top 10, although he did finish 3rd at his home race. He was also short of top results in 2006. At the Sachsenring he ran 3rd early on, and was still in the top 6 when he went out wide to avoid Kenny Roberts, Jr. crashing, only to be hit by the American's riderless bike.

In 2007 he joined the Tech 3 Yamaha team in MotoGP using Dunlop tyres, alongside French rider Sylvain Guintoli. He was generally outpaced by his rookie teammate and finished the season 18th.

Superbike World Championship
He was left with no options in MotoGP so for  he turned his focus on the Superbike World Championship. Kawasaki expressed their desire to hire him, quoting: "Tamada has been a target for Kawasaki for some time and his signing consolidates the PSG-1 team and Kawasaki’s mutual commitment to gain success in the forthcoming season."

For 2009 he remained a factory Kawasaki rider, as they switched their support to the English Paul Bird Motorsport team, alongside Australian Broc Parkes.

On October 6, 2009, Kawasaki announced that Tamada would not be offered a contract for 2010. His place will be taken by former MotoGP rider Chris Vermeulen.

2010
In 2010 Tamada returned to WSBK in a one-off outing for the Reitwagen BMW team at Portimao in Portugal. He retired from the first race and finished 19th in the second race.

2011
On July 31, 2011 Tamada competed in the Suzuka 8 Hour race for the Musashi RT Harc-Pro team. He rode alongside former 500cc racer Tadayuki Okada and Takumi Takahashi. The team eventually took third position in the race, roughly one and a half minutes after the winning team finished.

In late August it was announced that Tamada will race in the Nurburgring round of the 2011 World Superbike Championship for the Castrol Honda team. He will replace Spaniard Ruben Xaus who is sitting out the race due to a back injury.

2012
Tamada was appointed official trainer of the inaugural Asia Dream Cup season by Honda in 2012.  The Asia Dream Cup races with Honda CBR250R.  Two riders from each Asian country is selected.  Tamada was appointed to train the young riders to one day become a World Championship rider.

In July, Tamada competed in the Suzuka 8 Hours with Honda Team Asia.  Teammates were Malaysian rider, Azlan Shah Kamaruzaman and Japanese veteran, Chojun Kameya.  They qualified 10th.  Early mechanical problems forced them to a 25th finish.

2013
Honda and Tamada's agency, Speed of Japan both announced Tamada's full time ride in the Asia Road Racing Championship in the Supersports 600 class with MUSASHi Boon Siew Honda Racing, the factory team for Honda in the series. He is replacing in Ryuichi Kiyonari, who won the title in 2012 and has gone back to BSB in 2013.

Tamada, stating that it took him more time to get used to a 600cc machine at the beginning of the season, actually made it fast.  He got his first podium finish at Race 2 of Round 1 in Sepang.  He then got his first win at Race 1 at Round 3, and went on winning Race 2.

However, he suffered the later half of the season from injuries he got from a crash during the Suzuka 8 Hours practice.  Fractures of the left clavicle and scapula, as well as fractures on the left ankle were found.  Furthermore, a minor amputation of the left middle finger was found.  This made Tamada pull out of the Suzuka 8 Hours race, as well as, Round 4 and 5 of the Asia Road Racing Championship.

Career statistics

Career highlights
1995–11th, All Japan Road Race GP250 Championship #73    Honda RS250R
1996–14th, All Japan Road Race GP250 Championship #11    Honda RS250R
1997–6th, All Japan Road Race GP250 Championship #14    Honda RS250R
1998–4th, All Japan Road Race GP250 Championship #6    Honda RS250R
1999–5th, All Japan Road Race Superbike Championship #100    Honda RVF750 RC45
2000–3rd, All Japan Road Race Superbike Championship #100    Honda RVF750 RC45
2001–2nd, All Japan Road Race Superbike Championship #100    Honda VTR1000F
2002–4th, All Japan Road Race Superbike Championship #100    Honda VTR1000F
2003–11th, MotoGP #6    Honda RC211V
2004–6th, MotoGP #6    Honda RC211V
2005–11th, MotoGP #6    Honda RC211V
2006–12th, MotoGP #6    Honda RC211V
2007–18th, MotoGP #6    Yamaha YZR-M1
2008–20th, Superbike World Championship #100    Kawasaki ZX-10R
2009–27th, Superbike World Championship #100    Kawasaki ZX-10R
2011–3rd, Suzuka 8 Hours #634    Honda CBR1000RR
2012–25th, Suzuka 8 Hours #25    Honda CBR1000RR
2013–8th, Asia Road Race SS600 Championship #100    Honda CBR600RR
2014–6th, Asia Road Race SS600 Championship #100    Honda CBR600RR

Grand Prix motorcycle racing

By season

Races by year
(key) (Races in bold indicate pole position; races in italics indicate fastest lap)

Superbike World Championship

Races by year
(key) (Races in bold indicate pole position; races in italics indicate fastest lap)

References

External links

 speedofjapan.com Speed of Japan

1976 births
Living people
Tech3 MotoGP riders
Superbike World Championship riders
People from Matsuyama, Ehime
Japanese motorcycle racers
Pramac Racing MotoGP riders
MotoGP World Championship riders
250cc World Championship riders